Thrinchinae is a subfamily of grasshoppers, with genus found in Africa, Europe and Asia.

Genera 
The following genera are recognised in two tribes of the subfamily Thrinchinae:

Haplotropidini
Authority: Sergeev, 1995
 Haplotropis 
 Humphaplotropis 
 Sinohaplotropis 
 Sulcohumpacris

Thrinchini
Authority: Stål, 1876
 Asiotmethis 
 Atrichotmethis 
 Beybienkia 
 Dhofaria 
 Eoeotmethis 
 Eotmethis 
 Eremocharis 
 Eremopeza 
 Eremotmethis 
 Filchnerella 
 Glyphanus 
 Glyphotmethis 
 Iranotmethis 
 Melanotmethis 
 Mongolotmethis 
 Pezotmethis 
 Prionotropis 
 Rhinotmethis 
 Strumiger 
 Thrinchus 
 Tmethis 
 Tuarega 
 Utubius

References 

Pamphagidae